Antelope was launched at Nantes in 1805 under another name. She was taken in prize c.1807 and appears in Lloyd's Register in 1807 with Le Pelley, master, Lehou & Co., owner, and trade London–Madeira.

Captain John Le Pelley acquired a letter of marque on 28 August 1807. The size of Antelopes crew and the scale of her armament suggests that the intent was to employ her as a privateer. 

On 29 December 1807 Antelope, Le Pelley, master, sailed from Gravesend, bound for Port Jackson. In September 1808 she was reported to have been at Rio de Janeiro, having come from Falmouth. A list of vessels that entered and left Port Jackson between 1800 and 1817 does not list Antelope.

Instead, Le Pelley apparently sailed to the Pacific via Cape Horn. On 12 October 1808 Antelope and the whaler , Thomas Anderson, master, captured the Spanish ship Nueva Castor, Ramón Goycochea, master. Nueva Castor had left Valparaiso the day before. Goycochea did not resist, and showed his British captors documents attesting to the signing of an armistice between Spain and Britain. Anderson and LePelley ignored the documents and proceeded to loot Nueva Castor of her cargo. They also threw overboard those of her guns they could not transfer to their vessels. The British then allowed Goycochea and Nueva Castor to sail on to Callao.

On 17 February 1809 Antelope, Le Pelley, master, was off Rio de Janeiro, having come around Cape Horn. She had sustained damage in several engagements with Spanish warships. She arrived at Guernsey in May from Rio de Janeiro.

On 29 March 1810 Antelope, Le Pelley, master, was off Dover, having come from Rio de Janeiro and the River Plate. She arrived in Guernsey from London in May, having made that transit in 38 hours. 

Le Pelley acquired a second letter of marque on 4 September 1810 that gave her a crew of only 18 men, rather than the 50 of the prior letter.

Lloyd's Register for 1811 still gave her master's name as J. La Pelley, and her owner as LeHou & Co. Her trade was now London–Guernsey. The Register of Shipping for 1812 gave her master as J. LePelly, her owner as Lirou & Co., and her trade as Plymouth–Newfoundland.

Antelope sailed from London to Bengal in 1811 with dispatches for the British East India Company (EIC) and remained in India.

Citations and references
Citations

References
 
 

1805 ships
Ships built in France
Captured ships
Age of Sail merchant ships of England
Ships of the British East India Company